James Waldron Lavers (February 1, 1911 – July 4, 1979) was a Canadian politician and judicial clerk. He represented 5th Kings in the Legislative Assembly of Prince Edward Island from 1974 to 1978 as a Liberal.

Waldron was born in 1911 in Georgetown, Prince Edward Island. He married Lillian Blanche Walker in 1936. From 1947 to 1974, Lavers worked as a judicial clerk. He also served on Georgetown Town Council, and was deputy mayor.

Lavers entered provincial politics in the 1974 election, defeating Progressive Conservative Lowell Johnston by 108 votes to become councillor for the electoral district of 5th Kings. Lavers was defeated by Johnston when he ran for re-election in 1978.

Lavers died in Charlottetown on July 4, 1979.

References

1911 births
1979 deaths
People from Kings County, Prince Edward Island
Prince Edward Island Liberal Party MLAs
Prince Edward Island municipal councillors